Joe Baldwin (born November 16, 1938) is an American rower. He competed in the men's eight event at the 1960 Summer Olympics.

References

1938 births
Living people
American male rowers
Olympic rowers of the United States
Rowers at the 1960 Summer Olympics
Sportspeople from Long Beach, California